During the 1999–2000 English football season, Grimsby Town F.C. competed in the Football League First Division.

Season summary
After a brilliant first full season back in the second tier finishing 11th, Grimsby a season later really struggled and finished the 1999–2000 season in 20th, avoiding relegation at the expense of Buckley's former club Walsall.

Transfers

Transfers In

Loans In

Transfers Out

Loans Out

Final league table

Results
Grimsby Town's score comes first

Legend

Football League First Division

FA Cup

League Cup

Squad

Left club during season

References

Grimsby Town F.C. seasons
Grimsby Town F.C.